Mohamed Nafa (15 May 1939 – 15 July 2021) was an Israeli Druze  politician who served as a member of the Knesset for Hadash from 1990 until 1992.

Biography
Born in Beit Jann during the Mandate era, Nafa attended a high school in Rameh. He went on to study Hebrew and Arabic literature at the Hebrew University of Jerusalem.

In 1965 he joined the youth movement of Maki, the Israeli communist party. In 1965 he became secretary-general of the Union of Communist Youth. He was on the Hadash list (an alliance of Maki and other left-wing groups) for the 1988 Knesset elections, but failed to win a seat. However, he entered the Knesset on 14 February 1990 as a replacement for the long-serving Tawfiq Ziad. He lost his seat in the 1992 elections. He served as Maki's secretary-general from 1993 until 2002, and again since 2007.

Nafa died on 15 July 2021 at the age of 82.

References

External links

1939 births
2021 deaths
Arab people in Mandatory Palestine
Druze members of the Knesset
Israeli Druze
Hadash politicians
Hebrew University of Jerusalem alumni
Maki (political party) politicians
Members of the 12th Knesset (1988–1992)
People from Beit Jann